Igrexa de San Antolín de Toques is a church in Toques, Province of A Coruña, Galicia, Spain. It was founded in the 10th century.

References

Churches in Galicia (Spain)
Buildings and structures in the Province of A Coruña
10th-century churches in Spain
Bien de Interés Cultural landmarks in the Province of A Coruña